Farleigh Hill is one of the highest points in the county of Hampshire, England. Its prominence of  just qualifies it as a ('P30') TuMP.

Farleigh Hill rises about 1 kilometre southeast of the M3 and the outskirts of Basingstoke in Hampshire. The B 3046 runs over the hill from southwest to northeast, passing within about 100 metres of the summit at a crossroads. In the vicinity are a number of houses and lodges, and Farleigh House School and Farleigh Wallop lie on the southeastern spur of the hill. The village of Cliddesden lies on the same road about 2 kilometres to the northeast.

References 

Hills of Hampshire